Catoptria fenestratellus is a moth in the family Crambidae. It was described by Aristide Caradja in 1928. It is found in Altai, Russia.

References

Crambini
Moths described in 1928
Moths of Asia